Arotrophora utarana is a species of moth of the family Tortricidae. It is found on Sulawesi in Indonesia.

The wingspan is about 18.5 mm. The forewings are cream, mixed with ferruginous in some areas. The posterior parts of the wing are suffused with brownish grey. The hindwings are brownish.

Etymology
The species name refers to Sulawesi Utara, the type locality.

References

Moths described in 2009
Arotrophora
Moths of Indonesia